Since the inauguration of Nobel Prize in 1901, until 2020, three Bengali persons and one Bengali origin person—four in all, have won this award. The first Bengali as well as the first Asian to be awarded the Nobel Prize in 1913, was Rabindranath Tagore (born in CALCUTTA India, now KOLKATA), in literature. Later in 1998, Amartya Sen (born in  India) in Economics, in 2006 Muhammad Yunus (born in British India, now Bangladesh) in Peace, and in 2019 Abhijit Banerjee (born in India to Marathi mother, Nirmala Patankar, and Bengali father, Dipak Banerjee), won this award in Economics.

List

Nominees

References

Bengali
Nobel